Color-code (stylized as color-code) is an all-female Japanese pop group formed by Italian-Japanese fashion director and editor, Nicola Formichetti.

History

In 2013, Nicola Formichetti, a frequent collaborator with singer-songwriter Lady Gaga, teamed up with Nippon Columbia to hold the POP ICON PROJECT TOKYO. Auditions "to discover a Japanese version of Lady Gaga" were held and three members were selected, Tsujikawa Nanami and Moriyasu Mako, both from Osaka, and Yasukawa Marisa from Chiba.

They released their debut single "I Like Dat" on September 17, 2014. Follow up single, "Hands UP!" was released on May 20, 2015.

In 2018, color-code signed with a new label, Dreamusic, and released single "if ~kono-goe ga todokunara~". In 2020, they released their debut album "Re∂l"

Discography

Albums

Singles

References

External links 
 color-code Official Site 

Japanese girl groups
Japanese pop music groups
Musical groups established in 2013
Nippon Columbia artists
2013 establishments in Japan